"Stupid Kid" is a song by the Chicago-based punk rock band Alkaline Trio, released as the first single from the group's 2001 album From Here to Infirmary. Two different versions of the single were released in the United Kingdom, where it became the band's first charting song by reaching #53 on the UK Singles Chart

The song's music video was directed by Matthew Barry and Maureen Egan. It depicts the band performing the song outside of a middle school. Inside the school, a boy becomes infatuated with his female teacher and makes attempts to impress her. When the teacher writes "you scare me" in the boy's yearbook, he is humiliated in front of the class and the other children laugh at him. He stands outside the classroom window and removes his tuque, revealing a pair of devil-like horns as the teacher is consumed by smoke.

Track listing

Personnel

Band
Matt Skiba – guitar, lead vocals
Dan Andriano – bass, backing vocals
Mike Felumlee - drums on "Stupid Kid", "The Metro", and "Private Eye"
Glenn Porter – drums on "She Took Him to the Lake" and "You've Got so Far to Go"

Production
Matt Allison – producer
Neil Weir – assistant producer on "Stupid Kid", "The Metro", and "Private Eye"
Jerry Finn – mix engineer on "Stupid Kid", "The Metro", and "Private Eye"
John Golden – mastering engineer on "She Took Him to the Lake" and "You've Got so Far to Go"

References 

Alkaline Trio songs
2001 singles
Vagrant Records singles
Songs written by Matt Skiba
Songs written by Dan Andriano
Songs written by Mike Felumlee
2001 songs